Permanent Vacation is the ninth studio album by American rock band Aerosmith, released by Geffen Records on August 25, 1987. The album marks the band's shift to a pop-metal sound that they would maintain up to 2001's Just Push Play.

Three hit singles were released from the album, "Dude (Looks Like a Lady)", "Angel", and "Rag Doll". It was their first to employ songwriters outside the band, instead of featuring songs solely composed by them. This came at the suggestion of executive John Kalodner. He also pushed the band to work with producer Bruce Fairbairn, who remained with them for another two albums. It was also the first Aerosmith album to be promoted by heavy music video airplay on MTV. Though Done with Mirrors was intended to mark Aerosmith's comeback, Permanent Vacation is often considered their true comeback, as it was the band's first truly popular album since their reunion. "Rag Doll", "Dude (Looks Like a Lady)", and "Angel" became major hits (all three charted in the Top 20) and helped Permanent Vacation become the band's greatest success in a decade.

Permanent Vacation has sold over five million copies in the U.S.

In the UK, it was the first Aerosmith album to attain both Silver (60,000 units sold) and Gold (100,000 units sold) certification by the British Phonographic Industry, achieving these in July 1989 and March 1990 respectively.

Reception
The album received mixed-to-positive reviews. In a retrospective assessment AllMusic gave the album four stars, and said "despite the mostly stellar songwriting, which makes it a strong effort overall, some of the album's nooks and crannies haven't aged all that well because of Fairbairn's overwrought production, featuring an exaggerated sleekness typical of most mid-'80s pop-metal albums". Dave Reynolds from Metal Forces magazine called the album "a shit hot album and one I’m gonna play the hell out of". Robert Christgau graded the album a C+, saying Aerosmith were "running out of gas again already".

Loudwire ranked the album as Aerosmith's 6th best album explaining the ranking with, "its lavish '80s production has definitely dated, but 'Permanent Vacation' still ranks among the greatest musical comebacks of all time". Loudersound placed the album on their list of the 20 best albums from 1987 and called it a "collection of sublime pop-metal".

Track listing

Personnel
Adapted from the album liner notes  and AllMusic.  Track numbers refer to CD and digital releases of the album.

Aerosmith
Steven Tylerlead vocals, piano, harmonica, organ, plunger mute
Joe Perryguitar: lead guitar (all except 10 & 12), lead and rhythm guitar on track 1, backing vocals, pedal steel guitar on "Rag Doll"
Brad Whitfordguitar: lead and rhythm guitar on track 1, lead guitar on tracks 8, 10 & 12
Tom Hamiltonbass guitar
Joey Kramerdrums

Additional musicians
Drew Arnottmellotron on "Angel" and "The Movie"
Tom Keenlysideclarinet, tenor saxophone, horn arrangement on "Dude (Looks Like a Lady)" and "Rag Doll"
Ian Putzbaritone saxophone on "Dude (Looks Like a Lady)" and "Rag Doll"
Bob Rogerstrombone on "Dude (Looks Like a Lady)" and "Rag Doll"
Henry Christiantrumpet
Bruce Fairbairntrumpet, cello, background vocals, production
Scott Fairbairncello
Mike Fraserplunger mute, engineering, mixing
Morgan Raelsteel drums
Jim Vallanceorgan on "Rag Doll" and "Simoriah"
Christine Arnottbacking vocals on "The Movie"

Production
Bob Rock – engineering
Ken Lomas – assistant engineering
George Marino – mastering
Kim Champagne – art direction
Andy Engel – illustrations
Neal Preston – photography

Charts

Certifications

See also 
List of glam metal albums and songs
Permanent Vacation Tour

References

1987 albums
Aerosmith albums
Geffen Records albums
Albums produced by Bruce Fairbairn
Albums recorded at Little Mountain Sound Studios
Glam metal albums